Leopolds Lēvenšteins (born 13 December 1893, date of death unknown) was a Latvian sprinter. He competed in the men's 100 metres at the 1912 Summer Olympics representing Russia.

References

1893 births
Year of death missing
Athletes (track and field) at the 1912 Summer Olympics
Latvian male sprinters
Male sprinters from the Russian Empire
Olympic competitors for the Russian Empire
Athletes from Riga